Hot-summer/cold-winter zone is the transient climate region between the cold and the hot zones in China. 

It includes the whole of Hubei, Hunan, Jiangxi, Anhui, Zhejiang provinces, Shanghai and Chongqing two municipalities, the eastern part of Sichuan and Guizhou provinces, the southern part of Henan, Jiangsu, Shanxi and Gansu provinces, and the northern part of Fujian, Guangdong and Guangxi provinces.

 
The main border of hot-summer/cold-winter zone is hot, humid summers and cold, humid winters. The temperature difference between day and night is normally small.  The precipitation in an average year is large. Sun radiation is relatively weak due to cloud cover.  

For historical reasons, the residential buildings in this zone don’t have central HVAC systems and are not well insulated or otherwise weatherized. With the recent and rapid economic development of this region, demand for better indoor environments is rising. 

Many residents install 'minisplit' air conditioners to improve their thermal comfort. But electrical energy consumption is rising accordingly and is taxing the generation capacity. The Chinese government has created new national design standards and other efforts to lower the energy consumption while also constructing new power generating stations.

See also
 Air conditioning
 Climate
 Climate of China
 Thermal efficiency

References
1.Design Standard for Energy Efficiency of Residential Buildings in Hot Summer and Cold Winter Zone  JCJ 134—2001

Heating, ventilation, and air conditioning
Climate of China